The West Australian Youth Jazz Orchestra (WAYJO) is an Australian youth jazz orchestra based in Perth, Western Australia. WAYJO has 54 jazz musicians between 14 and 25 years of age and currently presents over 55 performances a year across Australia.

History 
The West Australian Youth Jazz Orchestra was founded in 1983. The original band was formed from secondary school students from the music specialist schools, young local musicians and some of the original students of the inaugural Jazz Studies course at the WA Academy of Performing Arts (WAAPA). 
By the early 1990s WAYJO had grown to two bands and by the late 1990s three bands were in operation each with its own Music Director, which remains the position today. The three bands are the Composers Ensemble, the Big Band and the Swing Band. Each band works on specific repertoire which builds on the existing skill levels of the musicians.

Since 2008 their Artistic Director is Mace Francis who is also Musical Director for their Wednesday Night Orchestra.

Albums 
Night and Day
Recorded October 1996 at the Western Australian Conservatorium of Music

WAYJO 1
MD - Graeme Lyall
Alto 1 - Michael Collinson
Alto 2 - Graeme Blevins
Tenor 1 - James Sandon
Tenor 2 - Ben Phillips
Baritone - Mark Sprogowski
Trumpet 1 - Darryl Wilson
Trumpet 2 - Damien Maughn
Trumpet 3 - Matthew Jodrell
Trumpet 4 - Benn Hodgkin
Trombone 1 - Jeremy Greig
Trombone 2 - Tim French
Trombone 3 - Peter Yunken
Bass Trombone - Brett Page
Guitar - Andre Bourgault
Piano - Tom O'Halloran
Bass - Graham Local
Drums - Gavin Kerr
Vocals - Bronwynn Way
Vocals - Penny Cullen

WAYJO 2 (The Queen Bee)
MD - Shane Mancuso
Alto 1 - Marion Collins
Alto 2 - Jodie Bennett
Tenor 1 - April Ashton
Tenor 2 - Aaron Cargill
Baritone - Chris Jodrell
Trumpet 1 - Sam Graham
Trumpet 2 - Simon O'Neill
Trumpet 3 - Tim Colgan
Trumpet 4 - Ben Basell
Trombone 1 - Laurence Le Page
Trombone 2 - Jayne Hehir
Trombone 3 - Kathryn Smith
Trombone 4 - Ben Harrison
Guitar - Antony Gray
Piano - Pat Drury
Bass - Philip Waldron
Drums - Tom Coveney

Tom Terrific
1.Taking a Break 09:33
2. Gemini 06:52
3. Fascinatin' Rhythm 04:39
4. Gayle Force 07:35
5.Imagination 05:44
6.Take It To The Ozone 06:47
7.Come Rain or Come Shine 06:13
8.My Favourite Things 04:26
9.Embraceable You 06:22
10.Tom Terrific 06:11
about
All tracks composed and arranged by WAYJO members at the time. 
Musical Director - Graeme Lyall
credits
released 1 February 1998 
Recorded December 1997 at WAAPA 
Mixed by Lee Buddle and Andrew Burch

Road to Red Hill
Featuring a collection of traditional jazz standards as well as original compositions, WAYJO's Road to Red Hill CD is the first official recording to include all the highly accomplished WAYJO bands, including the Composers Ensemble, Big Band and Swing Band.

Get Happy
This double CD features the 2011 and 2012 WAYJO Composers Ensemble.

CD 1 was recorded during the 2012 Sydney tour at the James Morrison Studios. The music featured comes from three composers WAYJO had worked with over recent years - Ed Partyka (GER), Franck Tortiller (FRA) and Jim McNeely (USA).

CD 2 is a live to air broadcast for the ABC recorded at the WA State Theatre Centre in 2011. The concert featuring the piano playing and compositions of Jim McNeely.
credits
released May 14, 2013

CD1 (tracks 1-5)
Alto 1 – Laura Corny
Alto 2 - Alana McPherson
Tenor 1 – Tom Greble
Tenor 2 – Luke Minness
Baritone – Mitch Boag
Trumpet 1 – Sam Timmerman
Trumpet 2 – Hayden Ward
Trumpet 3 – Michael Olsen
Trumpet 4 – Matthew McGlynn
Trombone 1 – Blake Phillips
Trombone 2 – James Cross
Trombone 3 – Lynne Loo
Bass Trombone – Alex Bradbury
Guitar – Nic di Gregaro
Piano – Gabriel Fatin
Bass – Jesse Byrom-Carter
Drums – Naomi Tan
Vocals – Anea Duratovic

Recorded June 7, 2012
James Morrison Studios Sydney
Recording Engineer John Morrison
Mixed by Lee Buddle and Mace Francis at Crank Recording, Perth
Mastered by Lee Buddle

CD2 (tracks 6-10)
Alto 1 – Laura Corny
Alto 2 - Erin Royer
Tenor 1 – Tom Greble
Tenor 2 – Luke Minness
Baritone – Mitch Boag
Trumpet 1 – Sam Timmerman
Trumpet 2 – Hayden Ward
Trumpet 3 – Ben Moody
Trumpet 4 – Matthew McGlynn
Trombone 1 – James Cross
Trombone 2 – Blake Phillips
Trombone 3 – Lynne Loo
Bass Trombone – Alex Bradbury
Guitar – Chris Sealy
Piano – Lewis Moody
Bass – Jesse Byrom-Carter
Drums – Bronton Ainsworth
Vocals – Allira Wilson

Recorded October 23, 2011
State Theatre Centre, Perth
Recording Engineers Karl Akers and Gavin Fernie
Mastered by Lee Buddle

Best of 2017
Released November 1, 2017

Basically Blues, recorded live at The Astor Theatre May 13, 2017 by Kris Vanderplas.
A Night in Tunisia, Census Night & My Country, recorded May 31, 2017 at RADA Perth by Kieran Kenderessy.
Chinese Whispers 2017, recorded October 1, 2017 at C401 Recording Studio, Showa University of Music, Japan by Masayuki Minato.
Beulah Witch & Bye Bye Blaackbird, recorded October 24, 2017 at RADA Perth by Kieran Kenderessy.
All tracks mixed and mastered by Kieran Kenderessy.
Cover Photography by Jess Herbert, Cover Design by Justine Thornley.

SHOWAYJO in Perth | Saxes: Alana Macpherson, Mayu Ito, Tim Newhouse, Harry Brooker, Meg Davidson. Trumpets: Matt Smith, Asumi Kinjo, Blake Armstrong, Chris Musitano. Trombones: Sam Hadlow, James van de Ven, Tomomi Hosoya, Alistair Barrow. Guitar: Ryoma Ito. Piano: Ayaka Toyohide. Bass: Kane Shaw. Drums: Jumpei Yashiro. Vocals: Annie Mitchell. Musical Director: Mace Francis & Masa Ikeda.

SHOWAYJO in Japan | Saxes: Alana Macpherson, Mayu Ito, Tim Newhouse, Ryouma Mano, Soko Nakagawa. Trumpets: Matt Smith, Masahito Kanatsu, Asumi Kinjo, Yumi Gokan. Trombones: Sam Hadlow, Tomomi Hosoya, Ryoka Kawachi, Mariko Mihara. Guitar: Ryoma Ito. Piano: Ayaka Toyohide. Bass: Kane Shaw. Drums: Jumpei Yashiro. Vocals: Annie Mitchell. Musical Director: Mace Francis & Masa Ikeda.

WEDNESDAY NIGHT ORCHESTRA | Saxes: Alana Macpherson, Tessa Campbell, Reece Clark,
Jemima Mills. Trumpets: Matt Smith, Harry Josland, Ben Lim, Chris Musitano.
Trombones: Blake Phillips, James van de Ven, Sam Hadlow, Alistair Barrow. Guitar: Joshua Nicholls. Piano: Tim Voutas. Bass: Kane Shaw. Drums: Jasper Miller. Vocals: Priscilla Gardner.
Musical Director: Mace Francis.

TUESDAY NIGHT ORCHESTRA | Saxes: Sam Holden, Joe Banks, Harry Brooker, Max Wickham,
Meg Davidson. Trumpets: Blake Robertson-Hall, James Chapman, Sam Fitzgerald, Zoe McGivern. Trombones: Alex Parkinson, James van de Ven, Jacob Augustson, Tom Salleo. Guitar: Sean Butler. Piano: James O’Brien. Bass: Joshua Cusack. Drums: William Chiew. Vocals: Annie Mitchell. Musical Director: Marty Pervan.

Best of 2018
PRODUCTION CREDITS
WAYJO Live recordings by Kieran Kenderessy - Tracks 1-4 & 6-13 - during the WAYJO Jazz at The Maj 2018 season on location Downstairs at The Maj, His Majesty’s Theatre, Perth Western Australia.
SHOWAYJO Studio recording by Kieran Kenderessy - Track 5 on July 1, 2018 at Crank Recording, Northbridge Western Australia.
Cover Photography by Eliza Cowling, Cover Design by Justine Thornley.
credits
released December 1, 2018

WAYJO Monday Night Orchestra (MNO) on tracks 04 Pennies From Heaven, 06 Ko Ko, & 12 Feeling Free
Saxophones: Shaniqa Ratnasingam, Holly Forster, Ryan Zare, Finn Own, Jazmin Ealden.
Trumpets: Bob Tweedie, Charlie Teakle, Brendan Arbuckle, Alex Kinsey .
Trombones: Holli Hatherley, Nicholas Apostolou Garcia, William Brook, Sophie Bennett .
Guitar: Santiago Garcia
Piano: James Wilson
Bass: Gavin Proude
Drums: Julius Rogers
Vocals: Lucy Iffla

WAYJO Tuesday Night Orchestra (TNO) on tracks 03 Tuning Up, 08 Der Traum, & 10 Jazz Euphoria on Frenchman Street
Saxophones: Sean Hayes, Joseph Banks, Max Wickham, Thomas Hamilton-Stone, Meg Davidson.
Trumpets: Dusan Cuculoski, Henry Van Den Wall Bake, Zoe McGivern, Julia Wallace.
Trombones: Alex Parkinson, Ollie Lane, Harrison Nichols, Tom Salleo.
Guitar: Dan Garner (tr 03 & 08) & Kyle Imlah (tr 10).
Piano: James O’Brien Bass: Joshua Cusack Drums: William Chiew.

WAYJO Wednesday Night Orchestra (WNO) on tracks 01 Hi Hat Man, 02 Bye Bye Blackbird, 07 Phaedrus, 09 The Dust That Falls From Dreams, 11 Ready, & 13 Evil Gal Blues
Saxophones: Tessa Campbell, Claire Keet, Tom Walsh (tr 2, 7 & 13), Tim Newhouse (tr 1, 2, 7, 11 & 13), Harry Brooker (tr 1 & 11), James Sewell (tr 9), Tarmon Simpson (tr 9), Jemima Mills.
Trumpets: Matt Smith, James Chapman, Ben Lim (tr 1, 2, 7, 11 & 13), Dusan Cuculoski (tr 9), Zoe McGivern (tr 1, 2, 7, 11 & 13), Corban Chapple (tr 9).
Trombones: Steve Bickley, James van de Ven (tr 2, 9 & 13), Sam Hadlow, Alex Parkinson (tr 1, 7 & 11), Alistair Barrow (tr 1, 2, 7, 11 & 13), Rob Coleman (tr 9).
Guitar: Oliver Vonlanthern
Piano: Tim Voutas
Bass: Kane Shaw
Drums: Ryan Daunt
Vocals: Laura Igglesden (tr 09)

SHOWAYJO (Showa Academia Musicae, Japan & WA Youth Jazz Orchestra) on track 05 Chinese Whispers 2018
Saxophones: Tessa Campbell, Miu Kawano, Claire Keet, Max Wickham, Meg Davidson.
Trumpets: Ricki Malet, Dusan Cuculoski, Maiko Mukaida James Chapman.
Trombones: Tom Salleo, James van de Ven, Ryoka Kawachi, Tomohiro Tanaka.
Piano: Tim Voutas
Bass: Joshua Cusack
Drums: Fuga Akase

Bands

Wednesday Night Orchestra 
The Wednesday Night Orchestra (WNO) is WAYJO's premiere ensemble, playing a variety of big band styles from the swing era to contemporary jazz. The focus is on presenting modern Australian composers including a program to promote local WA emerging composers. The music director for WNO is Mace Francis

Tuesday Night Orchestra 
The St John of God Tuesday Night Orchestra (TNO) presents big band music in the style of the 1950s and 60s – Big brass sounds with a swingin’ feeling. Count Basie and Duke Ellington classics are performed along with music from Thad Jones, Bill Holman, Gordon Goodwin and Bob Mintzer. The music director for TNO is Marty Pervan

Monday Night Orchestra 
The MinterEllsion Monday Night Orchestra takes its repertoire from Benny Goodman, Glenn Miller, Sy Oliver, Fletcher Henderson and Tommy Dorsey. The music director for MNO is Ricki Malet

Graduates & Alumni
 Linda May Han Oh (double bass)
 Jamie Oehlers (saxophone)
 Libby Hammer (voice)
 Graham Wood (Piano)
 Carl Mackey (Saxophone)
 Troy Roberts (saxophone)
 Daniel Susnjar (drums)
 Graeme Blevins (saxophone)
 Mat Jodrell (trumpet)
 Sarah McKenzie (piano)
 Jordan Murray (trombone)
 Catherine Noblet (trombone)
 Andrew Murray (trombone)
 Mace Francis (composer)
 Vanessa Perica (composer)
 Dane Alderson (electric bass)

Featured Composers

Australian 
 Graeme Lyall
 James Morrison
 Julian Lee
 Mace Francis
 Daryl McKenzie
 Grant Windsor
 Michael Wallace
 Daniel Thorne
 Tilman Robinson
 Alice Humphries
 Jenna Cave
 Rafael Karlen

International 
 Bob Brookmeyer
 Ed Partyka
 Maria Schneider

See also 
 List of youth orchestras

References 

Musical groups established in 1983
Australian youth orchestras